Douna Loup (born 1982) is a Swiss writer.

Biography
She was born in Geneva and grew up in the Drôme area of France. Loup began writing for children's theatre. She spent six months working in an orphanage in Madagascar. In 2010, she published Mopaya, Récit d'une traversée du Congo à la Suisse based on interviews with Gabriel Nganga Nseka. Her first novel L'embrasure was published by the Mercure de France in 2010. It was followed by a second novel Les lignes de ta paume in 2012 which was awarded the Prix des jeunes romancier du Salon du livre du Touquet.

Her play Et après le soleil se lève received the Prix de la Société Suisse des Auteurs.

References 

1982 births
Living people
Swiss women novelists
Swiss dramatists and playwrights
Swiss women dramatists and playwrights
Writers from Geneva